Kapoor & Sons, also known as Kapoor & Sons (Since 1921), is a 2016 Indian Hindi-language family-drama film directed by Shakun Batra and produced by Hiroo Yash Johar, Karan Johar and Apoorva Mehta under Dharma Productions, with Fox Star Studios serving as distributor and co-producer. Exploring themes of a dysfunctional family, the film stars Rishi Kapoor, Ratna Pathak Shah, Rajat Kapoor, Fawad Khan, Sidharth Malhotra and Alia Bhatt. Marking the second collaboration between Malhotra and Bhatt after their debut together in Student of the Year (2012), the film follows two estranged brothers who return to their dysfunctional family after their grandfather suffers a cardiac arrest. 

Made on a budget of  crore, Kapoor & Sons released in cinemas on 18 March 2016 and earned  crore worldwide, and was declared a blockbuster at the box office. It received high critical acclaim for its direction, story, screenplay, music and performances of the cast. 

At the 62nd Filmfare Awards, Kapoor & Sons received 8 nominations, including Best Film, Best Director (Batra) and Best Supporting Actress (Pathak Shah), and won 5 awards with Rishi Kapoor winning Best Supporting Actor over his co-stars and fellow nominees Khan and Rajat Kapoor. The film is available on Netflix and Amazon Prime Video.

Plot 
Estranged brothers Rahul and Arjun Kapoor are compelled to return to their childhood home in Coonoor when their 90-year-old grandfather Amarjeet suffers a heart attack. Rahul is a successful novelist and entrepreneur based in London who appears to be the most mature in the family. Arjun, on the other hand, is a part-time bartender and struggles to get his books published, resorting to working part-time as a bartender in Newark to make ends meet and writing in his spare time. Their parents, Harsh and Sunita, favor Rahul for being successful, which upsets Arjun. While the brothers struggle to get along, their parents grapple with their troubled marriage. Harsh is discouraging of Sunita's wish to open a catering business, and his past extramarital affair has blemished their relationship. While recovering in the hospital, Amarjeet expresses that his last wish is to take a family photo titled "Kapoor & Sons, since 1921".

Sunita finds out that Harsh has broken her FD in order to pay some bank loans. She feels cheated, as she had saved the money to start her catering business. Sunita confronts Harsh and they get into an argument, which soon involves both Arjun and Rahul. Arjun leaves the house in the heat of the moment and goes to a party to divert his mind, where he befriends and becomes attracted to the homeowner, a young and free-spirited girl named Tia Malik.

Rahul also meets Tia the next day while surveying her property, and the two go out for dinner. Rahul drops her home, which is when the two realize that the power is out. While trying to fix the system, to Rahul's surprise, Tia spontaneously kisses him. Rahul does not share this with anyone.

During a date with Tia, Arjun tells her he suspects Rahul of plagiarizing his idea to write his bestselling novel, but that he never confronted his brother to avoid causing another rift in the family. The ending was different, but the characters and subplots were very similar. After the date, Tia confides in her friend that she has feelings for Arjun and regrets kissing Rahul.

The Kapoor family throws a party to celebrate Amarjeet's birthday. Arjun discovers that Tia and Rahul know each other and fears that they have something between them, but Rahul clarifies that he is already in a committed relationship in London. Problems arise when the family finds out that Harsh invited Anu, the woman with whom he had an affair, leading to another argument that ends the party. Harsh and Sunita later reminisce on how happy they were. Harsh apologizes for losing all their money.

On her birthday, Tia discloses that she lost her parents at the age of thirteen in a plane crash. They had gone to Canada for her uncle's surgery and missed her birthday. She regrets that during her last conversation (i.e. a phone call) with her parents, she told them to never return.

The Kapoor family tries to fulfill Amarjeet's wish to take a family photo, but various damaging secrets come to light that day. Rahul finds out that his father was lying about having ended his affair with Anu, while Sunita discovers that the relationship Rahul has in London is actually with another man. Tia regretfully tells Arjun what happened between her and Rahul, angering him. The family photo doesn't take place because Sunita walks away angrily. Harsh tries to talk to her, but she doesn't listen. He gets into his car and drives away to cool down. Arjun later finds out that Rahul has been reading his latest manuscript, and physically attacks him. Sunita breaks up the fight and admits to Arjun that she gave his first manuscript to Rahul, thinking that Arjun was not serious about becoming an author. After calming down a bit, Sunita gives Harsh a call. Harsh tries to pick up the phone while driving and gets hit by a truck due to not paying attention to the road. He dies as a result of his injuries, devastating the family. After the funeral, Rahul comes out as gay to Arjun and the two leave for London and Newark, respectively.

After four months, the brothers receive a video message from Amarjeet, requesting them to come back, as he is feeling alone. Sunita comes to terms with Rahul's homosexuality, Arjun's book is going to be published and Arjun and Tia get back together after clearing their misunderstanding. The family finally takes the family photo Amarjeet wanted, where they place a cutout of Harsh in his memory.

Cast

Production 
In early 2015, Karan Johar announced his next film, titled Kapoor & Sons, which will feature Fawad Khan with Sidharth Malhotra and Alia Bhatt as the lead roles. Johar said in an interview "We have a very stylish star cast." The movie revolves around two brothers played by Fawad Khan and Sidharth Malhotra. Rishi Kapoor will be playing the grandfather of the male leads. Karan Johar said in an interview, "Kapoor & Sons (Since 1921) was a tough film to cast. There was a point when we almost didn't make it. We kept it on the backburner for over a year. No one was willing to do Fawad Khan's role. We went to six actors and after six rejections, I told Shakun Batra (director) that we should drop the idea and he started developing another screenplay."

Soundtrack 

The music for the film is composed by Amaal Mallik, Badshah, Arko, Tanishk Bagchi, Benny Dayal and Nucleya. The background score is given by Sameer Uddin. The lyrics are penned by Badshah, Kumaar, Manoj Muntashir, Dr. Devendra Kafir, and Abhiruchi Chand. Sony Music India have acquired the music rights of the film. Sameer Uddin won Best Background Score at the 62nd Filmfare Awards. The film's first song "Kar Gayi Chull", a party song, was released on 17 February 2016. The second song "Bolna" was released on 24 February 2016. The full music album was released on 4 March 2016 by Sony Music India which consisted of 5 songs.

Times of India Mohar Basu didn't like the idea of multiple composers. In his 3 out of 5 stars review, he mentioned "Kar Gayi Chull" as the only well-composed song of the album. Swetha Ramakrishna, journalist of Firstpost mentioned that the adapted songs of the film hadn't brought a new thing to the table except for the slight change of lyrics. She, however, praised Arko's "Saathi Re" and felt that other songs of the album are forgettable. Rohwit of The Quint, giving the album one and a half star, said the album has nothing new to offer. He noted that "Bolna"'s tune was reminiscent of Pakistani songs like "Samjhawan" and "Laiyya Laiyya". The former being recreated in Humpty Sharma Ki Dulhania.

Asees Kaur was acclaimed for "Bolna" by critics like Rediff.coms Aelina Kapoor. Some critics such as Surabhi Redkar of Koimoi noted that "Buddhu Sa Mann" resembled Mallik's previous hit song "Sooraj Dooba", but Mallik couldn't deliver up to a mark with this one. "Bolna" was seen by critics to have been included because of Fawad Khan's presence.

Critical response 
The film upon its release received critical praise, particularly for Fawad Khan's performance.

India 
Srijana Mitra Das from The Times of India gave it 5.0 stars & said, “Kapoor & Sons's star is its story. An entirely real family full of uncomfortable secrets, awkward jealousies, & sharp pain where brothers steal, parents cheat, siblings suspect, & 'perfect bachchas' don't have perfect love-lives.” Rohit Vats of Hindustan Times gave it 4/5 stars and called it a "fantastic family drama after a long time". Harshada Rege of DNA gave the film 4/5 stars and praised all characters in general and Fawad Khan in specific saying, "it's Fawad who shines bright. His performance as the "perfect" son with a secret, stands out. The actor shows versatility and vulnerability with equal ease. There's a lot more to this actor than good looks and charm". Anupama Chopra of Film Companion gave it 3.5/5 stars and commended the onscreen performances saying, "The actors breathe life in these movements." Saibal Chatterjee of NDTV gave the film 3.5/5 stars and said, "Kapoor & Sons is intense and incisive in its observation of human inadequacies but is always entertaining". Raja Sen of Rediff.com gave it 3/5 stars and said, "A likeable enough little film with fine characters, Kapoor & Sons tries too hard to turn on the water works at the end, going from a good, mellow drama to a full-blown melodrama by the end of it all". Ankush Bahuguna of MensXP.com gave the film 4/5 stars and called it "breathe of fresh air" and "one of the best family films ever made in Bollywood". Subha Shetty-Saha gave it 4/5 stars and praised star cast saying, "it is the near perfect casting that works for the film too". Rachit Gupta of Filmfare praised the film saying, "it will be a tough order for any film this year to be as good as Kapoor & Sons". Dhriti Sharma of Zee News said, "The movie looks like a beautiful tiara, an amalgamation of fine comic punches that further grow with twists and curls into electrifying chemistry, ultimately rising to the reality block-- distorted yet perfect family".

Bollywood Hungama gave the film 4 stars and wrote that the film "makes for an excellent movie that you must watch with your entire family. This film is beautiful, kar gayi chull!". Stutee Gosh of The Quint gave the film 4.5/5 saying, "The first half is rib-tickling and super fun while the real action in the form of plot twists awaits us in the second half". She, although having praised Khan's performance, said his looks distracts viewers from parts of the film. Mehul S Thakkar of Deccan Chronicle gave it 4.5/5 and said, praising direction of the film, "all credit goes to director Shakun, who holds together the cast like a perfect photo in an album. His sensibilities in this family drama will certainly set a new benchmark". Shubhra Gupta of The Indian Express, gave 2 stars out of 5 stating, Sidharth brings to the table a loose-limbed pleasing vulnerability which he reveals slowly. Fawad plays his straight but awesome role. Namrata Joshi from The Hindu called it "the ultimate family film" and commented, "It is yet another film that has been brilliantly crafted and mapped out in terms of the writing, how the scenes slowly get built up towards a crescendo. It's an onion peel narrative in which the relationships, revelations, secrets and lies, unfinished confidences, unresolved issues, betrayals and conflicts are unspooled layer by layer." Talking about the characters, she described Khan's role "charming and delightful", Malhotra's as "solid and vulnerable", Bhatt as "hyper and ditzy" while calling Kapoor's role as "disappointing and out-of-sync".

Ananya Bhattacharya of India Today gave the film 3.5 stars and summarised the film as "madhouse-drama" while stating, "Shakun Batra's Kapoor And Sons wins in being able to portray the quick fixes that every family has to employ sometime or the other. This is what shines through. Batra crafts a refreshing tale of family problems and the art of sweeping them under the carpet. She also praised Khan's role, while praising Rajat Kapoor and Pathak's characters as "incomparable". She also applauded the film's cinematography and music. Anna M.M. Vetticad of Firstpost summed up the film as "the best film of 2016 so far". She stated, "Kapoor & Sons is hilarious, heartwarming and heartbreaking rolled in one. It does not wear its social conscience on its sleeve, but make no mistake about this: it has one. This is a disarmingly entertaining, thoughtful film that evokes a fuzzy feeling of warmth. It left me with wet cheeks, a smile on my face and a chuckle welling up in my throat at the memory of Daadu". Nirmalya Dutta of Daily News and Analysis described Khan's role as a gay male as "a big leap forward for India's LGBT movement, Khan had the guts and gumption to play this seminal role."

Overseas 
Surabhi Redkar form Koimoi gave the film 3.5 stars and mentioned, "Kapoor And Sons is a modern-age family drama. It does not shy away from being emotionally soppy yet convincingly lovable. You could laugh, cry and smile through this one!". Redkar praised the characters' realistic nature. Manjusha Radhakrishanan of Gulf News gave it 3.5 stars and said, "Kapoor & Sons flourishes as a unit and is the sum total of mature performances by the entire Kapoor clan". Rachel Slatz of New York Times said, "Even though "Kapoor & Sons" goes from lightly comic to more darkly dramatic to pretty overtly melodramatic, it never loses its lived-in quality or plunges into the absurd". Deepa Gaurl of Khaleej Times gave it 2.5/5 and said, "Kapoor & Sons is heart-warming alright but fails short of building on the fantastically captured 'reality' it achieves early on, ending up 'neither here nor there." Although her review of the film was moderate, she praised Fawad Khan's performance saying, "The film, to a great extent, belongs to Fawad Khan – and he is terrific". Suprateek Chatterjee of HuffPost wrote, "Oddly enough, despite several chaotically edited sequences that have little breathing space and rely largely on exposition, the film feels bloated".

ARY News praised Shakun Batra's direction writing, "Batra creates a very watchable portrait of a house in crisis". It also commended Rajat Kapoor, Ratna Pathak Shah, and Fawad Khan for their performances. Zeshan Ahmad of The Express Tribune gave the film 4/5 stars and wrote, "Kapoor & Sons is a lesson in how a film can be entertaining, emotional and thought-provoking at the same time. A compelling script and brilliant performances in particular make it a must-watch!". Sana Fatima of The Nation gave it 8/10 stars and called it "one of the most methodically planned family drama". Daily Times wrote, "Nonetheless, the story manages to descend bare into the psyche of audiences with debonair imagery tied with picturesque beauty, keeping you mesmerized". Arva Aslam of Daily Pakistan said that all the credit for the film goes to its cast.

Box office

Domestic 

On opening day the film had its 900 prints released on 1500 screens and collected 6.85 crores in India to become fourth biggest opener of the year. On second day, the film collected 7.75 crores and took its two days collection to 14.60 crore. The film, on its first Sunday,
collected 11.75 crores taking its domestic weekend's net collection to 26.35 crores. This was the second highest opening weekend collection of the year. Within its weekdays, the film became the 4th highest grossing Bollywood film of the year surpassing the lifetime collections of Mastizaade and Jai Gangaajal. In the first week, the film collected 47 crore which is the second highest opening week collection of the year following Airlift. The film continued running on more than 1000 screens in the following week. In the second week, the film collected 17.14 crore raising its domestic collection to 65.07 crore. After three weeks of theatrical run, the film collected 71.57 crore and grossed 102.24 crore. It became the third film of year to gross more than 100 crore.

International 

The film collected 19.27 crore in its opening weekend overseas and became the highest first weekend opener of the year. In Pakistan, the film released on 67 screens and collected 1.3 crore on the first day. In the first weekend it collected 3.6 crore from Pakistan and became Fawad Khan's highest weekend opener in Pakistan, surpassing his debut Khoobsurat. Kapoor & Sons also had the biggest opening week of the year in the international market as it collected 0.42 crore.

Awards and nominations

References

External links 
 
 
 

2016 films
2010s Hindi-language films
2016 romantic comedy-drama films
Films scored by Amaal Mallik
Films scored by Benny Dayal
Films scored by Badshah
Films scored by Tanishk Bagchi
Films scored by Arko Pravo Mukherjee
Films scored by Nucleya
Films about dysfunctional families
Films shot in Mumbai
Films shot in Tamil Nadu
Gay-related films
Indian buddy comedy-drama films
Indian romantic comedy-drama films
Indian LGBT-related films
Fox Star Studios films
Films shot in Ooty
2016 comedy films
2016 drama films